Blepharomastix astenialis is a moth in the family Crambidae. It was described by Harrison Gray Dyar Jr. in 1922. It is found in Mexico.

References

Moths described in 1922
Blepharomastix